.

Victor Surbek (1885–1975) was a Swiss painter from Bern.

After studies in Italy, Germany (Kunstgewerbeschule München, Kunstgewerbeschule Karlsruhe) and Paris (Académie de la Grande Chaumière), he married fellow painter Marguerite Frey-Surbek in 1914 and operated a painting school with her up until 1931. Surbek travelled widely and displayed his works at numerous expositions after 1905. In 1964, he and his wife set up a foundation to care for his works and archives in Spiez.

Much influenced by Hodler, Surbek was a typical representative of Swiss figurative art. His very extensive work includes mainly landscapes, but also detail studies, portraits and still lifes.

References
 
  Biography on g26.ch

20th-century Swiss painters
Swiss male painters
People from Bern
1885 births
1975 deaths
Alumni of the Académie de la Grande Chaumière
20th-century Swiss male artists